Clobutinol is a cough suppressant formerly distributed by Boehringer Ingelheim and its licensees under the names Lomisat and Silomat, by Bioter as Biotussin, and by Violani-Farmavigor as Pertoxil. It has been withdrawn from the market worldwide.

Side effects and withdrawal
Side effects include drowsiness, dizziness, insomnia, nausea, vomiting, and abdominal discomfort.
Studies in 2004 had indicated that clobutinol has the potential to prolong the QT interval.
Clobutinol was in 2007 determined to cause cardiac arrhythmia in some patients.

Boehringer Ingelheim products containing clobutinol were voluntarily withdrawn from sale in Germany, and the rest of the world, on August 31, 2007.

The approval for Germany and the EU was revoked in 2008.

Prior to withdrawal, it was available throughout Europe and Central America, as well as in South Africa. Trade names include Biotussin, Lomisat (Spain), Pertoxil (Italy), and in most of the world, Silomat.

Synthesis

The Mannich reaction of 2-butanone (1) with formaldehyde and dimethylamine gives 4-Dimethylamino-3-methyl-2-butanone [22104-62-7] (2). Grignard reaction with 4-chlorobenzylchloride [104-83-6] (3) afforded clobutinol (4).

See also 
 QT interval
 Long QT syndrome

References 

Antitussives
Chloroarenes
Dimethylamino compounds
Tertiary alcohols